D. Santosh (born 26 September 1976) is an Indian film and theatre actor from Trichy, Tamil Nadu who works in Hindi films and theatre plays.

Early life

Santosh was born on 19 September 1976. He is an engineering graduate from PSG Tech, Coimbatore, Tamil Nadu.

Career

His desire to learn 'the performing art' made him enroll in a workshop conducted by Amol Palekar and Bhakti Barve in 1998. Following that, he joined Pandit Satyadev Dubey's free workshops and soon started performing in plays. His tryst with genius playwright-director Makarand Deshpande started as a backstage artist for his play Vasanth Ka Teesra Youvan. Since then, he has been an integral part of Deshpande's Ansh Theatre Group doing three plays — Saa Hi Besura, Ek Kadam Aage and Sakharam Binder Ki Khoj Mein Hawaldar.

According to Santosh: 
"Theater to me is 'Riyaaz' and so I will continue pursuing it. In movies, a character ends as soon as the closing credits show up. But in theatre, a character lives and dies with every show. We can experiment with the character. Every show gives the actor the opportunity to live the character. One can see the happiness, sadness and various other emotions in audience's eyes. Theater is a complete visual and aural experience of performing art. I just love to be a part of this world".

His first film role was in the Rajkumar Santoshi directed movie The Legend of Bhagat Singh as the legendary revolutionary Shivram Hari Rajguru. In a relatively short period, he has been honored to work with all the leading names in the industry — directors like Shivam Nair, Pradeep Sarkar, Nagesh Kukunoor, Madhur Bhandarkar, Indra Kumar, E. Niwas, Ram Gopal Verma, Saeed Mirza, Shimit Amin. In addition, he has shared screen-space with legendary actors like Amitabh Bachchan, Vinod Khanna, Aamir Khan, Mithun Chakraborty, Naseeruddin Shah, Ajay Devgn, Kay Kay Menon, Makarand Deshpande, Sonali Kulkarni, Akshay Kumar, Aishwarya Rai and Abhishek Bachchan.

In 2009, he received wide appreciation for his work as Giri Reddy, a porn-obsessed office colleague in the Shimit Amin directed and Ranbir Kapoor starrer Rocket Singh: Salesman of the Year. In addition to film and theatre, he has worked in TV commercials and his sole work in a short film VAAPSI won the award for the Best Short Film in MAMI, Mumbai.

Filmography

Plays and short films 

 Brahma Vishnu Mahesh - directed by Pandit. Satyadev Dubey-ji
 Montage - directed by Pandit. Satyadev Dubey-ji
 Ek kadam Aage - directed by Makarand Deshpande
 Brahma Vishnu Mahesh - directed by Makarand Deshpande
 Montage - directed by Makarand Deshpande
 Laila - directed by Makarand Deshpande
 Meenakumari - directed by Makarand Deshpande
 Basant Ka Teesra Youvna - directed by Makarand Deshpande
 Sir Sir Sarla - directed by Makarand Deshpande
 Dream men - directed by Makarand Deshpande; character: Ravi Shanbagh (mentally challenged boy)
 Sakharam Binder ki Khoj mein Hawaldar - directed by Makarand Deshpande
 Sa Hi Besura - directed by Makarand Deshpande
 Tea Break (short film) - directed by Shrinivas; character: Terrorist; released in 2006
 WAAPSI The Return - directed by Srinivas; character: The lonely person in big city ; winner (Best Short Film) of 2008 MAMI International Film Festival ; screened in L.A. and Japan International film festival

Awards and nominations

 Won the award for VAAPSI: Winner (Best Short Film) of 2008 MAMI International Film Festival, Mumbai
 Nomination for best actor in comic role Nokia Star Screen Awards 2009

References

External links

1976 births
Living people
Male actors from Mumbai
University of Mumbai alumni
Male actors in Hindi cinema
Indian male stage actors